Sor Lucía Caram (born 21 October 1966) is a Dominican Order nun, chef, writer, and presenter. She is Argentine, and currently resides in Spain.

Biography

Lucía Caram was born in Tucumán, the fifth of seven siblings, to a family of Lebanese descent. She was educated at a religious school.

During the dictatorship in Argentina from 1976 to 1983, Tucumán was punished by military repression, and she says that "it was then when [she] encountered people's suffering and the question of why there is violence. That was the first seed of [her] vocation."

Lucía Caram has lived in Spain for 27 years and resides in the Convent of Santa Clara de Manresa in Barcelona, where she promotes interreligious dialogue. She is the promoter of the Fundación Rosa Oriol, which serves 1,400 disadvantaged families.

She sparked outrage and received death threats after saying that Mary, mother of Jesus was not a virgin.

Television

She collaborates on the program Las mañanas de Cuatro.

Awards and recognitions

In 2006, she received the Àlex Seglers Memorial Prize in recognition of her activity in ecumenism, such as the creation of the Interreligious Dialogue Group in Manresa and her participation in the Second Catalan Parliament's Committee on Religions in 2006.

In 2015, she was given the Catalan of the Year Award, a prize that is granted by a vote from the readers of El Periódico de Cataluña and the viewers of the TV3 program .

Books

 1995,  Vive tu fe ¡El Catecismo en crucigramas!
 1997, El Evangelio en crucigramas
 2000, Nueva oración de los fieles I
 2000, Nueva oración de los fieles II
 2012, Mi claustro es el mundo
 2014, Estimar la vida
 2014, A Dios rogando
 2014, Amar la vida y compartirla
 2015, Sor Lucía se confiesa
 2015, Las recetas de Sor Lucía Caram

References

1966 births
Living people
Dominican nuns
Argentine Dominicans
Women chefs
Argentine chefs
People from Tucumán Province
Argentine expatriates in Spain
Argentine people of Lebanese descent
20th-century Argentine Roman Catholic nuns
21st-century Spanish nuns